Frank Simpson may refer to:

 Frank B. Simpson (1883–1966), American architect
 Frank Simpson (British Army officer) (1899–1986), British Army General
 Frank Simpson (cricketer) (1909–1992), British Army officer and cricketer
 Frank Simpson (politician) (born 1945), American politician in the Oklahoma Senate
 Frank W. Simpson (1872–1929), American college football coach
 Nuke (Marvel Comics), real name Frank Simpson, a fictional supervillain in the Marvel Universe